Maria Danilova (1793 – 1810) was a Russian ballet dancer.

Biography

Danilova enrolled in the St. Petersburg school at the age of eight. The trainer Charles-Louis Didelot took notice of her talent, and she made her first public appearance a year later. By the age of 15 she was dancing with Louis-Antoine Duport. Her dancing was described as "so light and elusive that it took the audience's breath away". Danilova had a fragile constitution and the stress of performance as well as a brief, unhappy affair with Duport took a toll on her health. She died of tuberculosis at the age of 17.

The Danilova crater on Venus is named in her honor.

References

Ballerinas from the Russian Empire
1793 births
1810 deaths
19th-century ballet dancers from the Russian Empire